Devar Hippargi Assembly constituency is one of 224 assembly constituencies in Karnataka State, in India. It is part of Bijapur (Lok Sabha constituency).

Assembly Members 
 2008:	A. S. Patil (Nadahalli), Indian National Congress

 2013:	A. S. Patil (Nadahalli), Indian National Congress

Also see
List of constituencies of the Karnataka Legislative Assembly

References

Assembly constituencies of Karnataka
Bijapur district, Karnataka